Beverwyck Manor is a historic home located at Rensselaer in Rensselaer County, New York.  It was built between 1839 and 1842. It is constructed of stucco over brick and consists of a three-story, three bay wide central block with the central bay recessed.  The central block is flanked by two story, single bay extensions.  It has a restrained Neoclassical facade and features a one bay portico with stone steps and four Ionic order stone columns.  It was built by William Paterson Van Rensselaer and later became part St. Anthony-on-Hudson Seminary, a Franciscan Seminary.

The Seminary closed in 1989. The manor was used as a retreat center for a time, and then converted to a residence for staff and retired Franciscans.

It was listed on the National Register of Historic Places in 1979.

References

External links

Houses on the National Register of Historic Places in New York (state)
Historic American Buildings Survey in New York (state)
Neoclassical architecture in New York (state)
Houses completed in 1842
Houses in Rensselaer County, New York
National Register of Historic Places in Rensselaer, New York
National Register of Historic Places in Rensselaer County, New York